The Bean Trees is the first novel by American writer Barbara Kingsolver. It was published in 1988 and reissued in 1998. The novel is followed by the sequel Pigs in Heaven.

Plot 

Taylor Greer sets out to leave home, Kentucky, and travel west, and finds herself in Oklahoma near Cherokee territory. As Taylor stops in the town, a woman suddenly approaches, deposits a small child, and leaves without explanation. Not knowing what else to do, Taylor decides to care for the child. The two travel to Tucson, Arizona, where she meets Lou Ann, a woman with a young son. Lou Ann had been married; her husband abandoned her and their child.

The novel traces the experiences of Taylor and the child, who Taylor names Turtle.

Setting 
The story takes place in real places in North America, including Kentucky, Oklahoma, and Arizona. It begins when the main character, Taylor, leaves her home in Pittman, Kentucky to find herself. First, her car breaks down in the middle of Oklahoma, later in Tucson, Arizona. She travels back to Oklahoma and again to Arizona because of the people she became close with throughout the novel.

Barbara Kingsolver's interest in nature is reflected in the Bean Trees, as it is full of descriptive landscapes and characters' passion towards the environment. The author uses history and biology to describe certain events or world issues related to nature.

Characters 
Taylor Greer, a native of Kentucky, is the protagonist and narrator of the novel. She is also known by her given name Marietta and nickname Missy. Taylor's personality is described as tough, adventurous, and independent throughout the novel.

Turtle is the three-year-old child who is left with Taylor in Oklahoma.

Lou Ann lives in Tucson and has a baby named Dwayne Ray. She is also originally from Kentucky and is Taylor's roommate.

Esperanza and Estevan are Guatemalan refugees that Taylor meets in Arizona.

Mattie is the owner of "Jesus is Lord Used Tires." She grows vegetables and beans in her garden, which is filled with tire parts. Her home is a place where undocumented immigrants stay.

Major themes 
The Bean Trees is a coming-of-age novel.

Barbara Kingsolver uses a nonstandard perspective to share the characters' adventures and the world they live in. The use of nonwhite mythology, anti-western sentiment, and not using the typical form of male adventure, allowed the author to explore the world where women were powerful and had a voice.

The novel shares negative traumatic experiences of the characters and people they meet, like Native Americans and Guatemalan refugees. While those scenes demonstrate qualities like sympathy and concern, they contribute to the overall spirit of the story being positive and uplifting.

The protagonist is raised by a single mother, which helps to develop themes of motherhood and nontraditional family values throughout the story, as Taylor, herself becomes Turtle's parent. The novel further explores nontraditional extended family through the relationships between the members of the community. It conveys the idea of interdependence and interaction, community's importance to each individual's life, and balance between independence and a sense of belonging. It also addresses the issue of parenthood through adoption. The novel makes reference to the issue of Native American parental rights as well.

The Bean Trees also portrays the effects of child abuse.

It portrays undocumented immigration from Latin America as some characters facilitate immigrants' escape from persecution.

At least one reader, familiar with Native American adoption rights, thought that the sequel, Pigs in Heaven, was written to correct misconceptions in the first book by Barbara Kingsolver. Themes of love and nurturing emerge from the violence and poverty that the characters face. The book conveys multiple symbolic meanings about shared motherhood, life and death, and beauty. The underlying themes not always recognized include those about mockery toward the judicial system, the flawed coping strategies of current-day issues, and the strength of friendship.

Style 
Jack Butler wrote for the New York Times, "The Bean Trees is as richly connected as a fine poem, but reads like realism."

Kingsolver employs irony in order to emphasize the changes to Taylor's lifestyle by the end of the novel.

Symbolism is used at the beginning of the story when the main character, Taylor, changes her name while starting the journey of self-discovery. The author evokes Westward expansion through Taylor's symbolic move to the west. Kingsolver's creation of the non-male dominant world, and focus on feminism and environmentalism, communicates the case of eco-feminism.

Reception 
The novel was well received by critics and has become commonly assigned reading in high school literature classes.

References

 

1988 American novels
Novels by Barbara Kingsolver
Novels set in Tucson, Arizona
Novels set in Oklahoma
1988 debut novels